Dorson is both a surname and a given name. Notable people with the name include:

Richard Dorson (1916–1981), American folklorist, writer, and academic
Sharon Dorson (born 1994), Congolese handball player
Dorson Boyce (born 1988), American football player

See also
Korson
Morson